The Deluge: The Great War, America and the Remaking of the Global Order, 1916–1931 is a history book by Adam Tooze first published by Allen Lane in 2014.

Reception
The book was widely reviewed. The Guardian called it a "bold analysis". The Daily Telegraph called it "a formidable achievement".

However, the book was also criticised by Kevin Matthews of George Mason University for being "shot through with misstatements, contradictions, inconsistencies and other, basic, errors". Matthews singled out interpretive errors primarily about events in British history, including the 1906 British election, the 1916 Irish uprising and the 1923 British election. He also criticised weak primary source attribution by Tooze.

During an interview with Aaron Bastani for Novara Media in 2023, Peter Hitchens said that The Deluge "must be one of the greatest history books ever written".

References

2014 non-fiction books
Books about Nazism
Allen Lane (imprint) books
Viking Press books